Cannibalism is the act of consuming another individual of the same species as food. Self-cannibalism is the practice of eating oneself, also called autocannibalism, or autosarcophagy. In recorded medical literature there were several incidents of autocannibalism.

Incidents

 Erzsébet Báthory allegedly forced some of her servants to eat their own flesh in the early 17th century.
 At the age of six, American child molester and suspected serial killer Nathaniel Bar-Jonah would pick at his scabs until his skin was festering, then proceed to suck on the blood from the wound.
 There are eyewitness accounts of cannibalism during the Siege of Leningrad (1941–1944), including reports of people cutting off and eating their own flesh.
 In the 1990s, a number of Ugandan young people in Uganda were forced to eat their own ears after their return to Sudan.
 Incidents of autocannibalism were reported in the years following the 1991 Haitian coup d'état.
 In 2009 in New Zealand, a 28-year-old man nicknamed as "Mr X" amputated his little finger with a jigsaw, cooked it in a pan around another vegetables and ate it. Apparently, the act was not brought on by drugs consumption or drinking problems. The man had a personal crisis in 2008 and, while suffering from insomnia and suicidal ideation, he fantasized about cutting his fingers. After the act, he felt relief and initially was excited, but not sexually. Later, the patient regretted the act. The incident was described as the first incident of auto-cannibalism in New Zealand.
 In 2014, a 34-year-old prisoner cut his thigh with a knife and had eaten the flesh about one hour after cutting the tissue.
 A 66-year-old man mutilated his fingers by biting them for six years, resulting in loss of the terminal phalanges of all fingers on both hands.
 Andre Thomas, a convicted murderer and death row inmate from Grayson County, Texas, US removed his left eye on 9 December 2008. He had already removed his right eye in 2004 after murdering his estranged wife and two children. After he removed his second eye, he ate it.
 David Playpenz, of Colchester, England, lost one of his fingers in a motorcycle accident. After asking for his amputated finger, he took it home and boiled it and ate the finger. Before that, he took a photo of the finger and posted on Facebook.
 21-year-old Brendan Higginbotham of County Kildare, Ireland was tortured by criminals in 2011. He had a rope tied around his neck, and bound his arms and was beaten with a sledgehammer and iron bar. The criminals sliced a portion of Higginbotham's ears and forced him to eat it. He lost half of his right ear and had to undergo plastic surgery.
 In 2012, 29-year-old Jargget Washington of Jersey City, United States, while high on PCP, stripped naked and tried to pull a driver out of the car. Soon after, he ate his medical bracelet and attempted to free himself from handcuffs by chewing on his wrists. While being transported to jail, he defecated in the police vehicle. After he was placed in jail, he gnawed off one of his fingers and swallowed it.
  In May 2018, the Reddit user u/IncrediblyShinyShart consumed his amputated foot with 10 of his friends. After an accident 2 years earlier, his foot would not heal, and the doctors suggested that he would be better if he amputated it. He subsequently asked his friends, "Remember how we always talked about how, if we ever had the chance to ethically eat human meat, would you do it?"

See also
 Self-cannibalism
 Cannibalism
 List of incidents of cannibalism

References

Incidents of cannibalism